This article provides information on candidates who stood for the 1929 Australian federal election. The election was held on 12 October 1929. There was no election for the Senate.

By-elections, appointments and defections

By-elections and appointments
On 3 August 1929, Thomas White (Nationalist) was elected to succeed William Watt (Nationalist) as the member for Balaclava.

Defections
In 1929, Nationalist MPs Billy Hughes (North Sydney), Edward Mann (Perth), Walter Marks (Wentworth) and George Maxwell (Fawkner) crossed the floor to bring down the Bruce Government. All were expelled from the Nationalist Party. The Speaker of the House of Representatives, Nationalist MP Sir Littleton Groom (Darling Downs), refused to use his casting vote to save the Government and was also expelled. All five contested the election as independents.

Retiring Members

No members retired in 1929.

House of Representatives
Sitting members at the time of the election are shown in bold text. Successful candidates are highlighted in the relevant colour. Where there is possible confusion, an asterisk (*) is also used.

New South Wales

Northern Territory

Queensland

South Australia

Tasmania

Victoria

Western Australia

See also
 Members of the Australian House of Representatives, 1928–1929
 Members of the Australian House of Representatives, 1929–1931
 List of political parties in Australia

References
Adam Carr's Election Archive - House of Representatives 1929

1929 in Australia
Candidates for Australian federal elections